Peter Halliday (2 June 1924 – 18 February 2012) was a Welsh actor.

Early life

The son of an auctioneer and estate agent, Halliday was brought up in Welshpool in Montgomeryshire, and attended Oswestry School in Shropshire. On leaving school he became an apprentice auctioneer with his father, but he had no desire to make it his career. He worked briefly for Rolls-Royce in Hucknall, Nottinghamshire before being called up by the Army during the Second World War, serving in Iraq, Palestine and Egypt.

While still in the Army, he auditioned successfully for the Royal Academy of Dramatic Art during time on leave.

Career

Halliday joined the Shakespeare Memorial Theatre Company alongside Richard Burton, Michael Redgrave and Ralph Richardson. He played regularly at Theatr Clwyd for six years, and spent two years at the National Theatre.

He played Dr. John Fleming in A for Andromeda (1961) and its sequel, The Andromeda Breakthrough (1962). He played various roles in Doctor Who, appearing in four stories between 1968 and 1988, and also provided the voices for two alien species in another two Doctor Who stories in 1970. He featured in episodes of other science fiction programmes including Out of the Unknown, UFO, Doomwatch and The Tripods. Although the vast majority of his screen roles were on television, he appeared in a few films, including the Merchant Ivory drama The Remains of the Day (1993).

Personal life

In 1956, Halliday married Simone Lovell, daughter of the Canadian-born actor Raymond Lovell. The couple went on to have three sons, before divorcing.

Death

He died on 18 February 2012 in London aged 87.

Filmography

Film
 The Battle of the River Plate (1956) – Guani's Secretary (uncredited)
 Dunkirk (1958) – Battery Major
 Captain Clegg (1962) – 1st Sailor Jack Pott
 Dilemma (1962) – Harry Barnes
 Calamity the Cow (1967) – Sergeant Watkins
 Sunday Bloody Sunday (1971) – Rowing Husband
 Clinic Exclusive (1971) – Mr. Fawcett
 Virgin Witch (1971) – Club Manager
 Madhouse (1974) – Psychiatrist
 The Swordsman (1974) – Rabelais
 Keep It Up Downstairs (1976) – P.C. Harbottle / Old Harbottle
 Giro City (1982) – Government Minister
 The Remains of the Day (1993) – Government Minister
 Lassie (2005) – Vicar (final film role)

Television
 Scotland Yard (1954) - Gypsy
 The Time Has Come (1960) – George Harris
 A for Andromeda (1961) – Dr. John Fleming
 The Andromeda Breakthrough (1962) – Fleming
 The Invasion, in Doctor Who (1968) – Packer
 A Question of Priorities, in UFO (1969) – Dr. Segal
 Doctor Who and the Silurians, in Doctor Who (1970) – Silurians (voice)
 The Ambassadors of Death, in Doctor Who (1970) – Aliens' Voices (voice)
 Carnival of Monsters, in Doctor Who (1973) – Pletrac
 Looking For Clancy (1975) – Sam Cook
 City of Death, in Doctor Who (1979) – Soldier
 Remembrance of the Daleks, in Doctor Who (1988) – Vicar
 Hearts and Minds (1995) – Shotton

References

External links
 
Gallifreyan Embassy link that mentions death date

1924 births
2012 deaths
20th-century Welsh male actors
21st-century Welsh male actors
Alumni of RADA
British Army personnel of World War II
People from Denbighshire
Welsh male film actors
Welsh male Shakespearean actors
Welsh male television actors